

Results

References

Men's 3 metre synchro springboard